ARY QTV, formerly known as Quran Television (QTV), is a Pakistani television channel with a Sunni Islam belief, that produces programs mainly having focus on the Ahlesunnat wal Jamaat. QTV is part of the ARY Digital Network of Pakistan.

The channel has shows featuring well-known scholars such as Pir Muhammad Alauddin Siddiqui, Saqib Iqbal Shami, Muhammad Raza Saqib Mustafai, Shaykh Hassan Haseeb Ur Rehman, Dr. Muhammad Tahir-ul-Qadri, Dr. Umar Al-Qadri, Mufti Abu Baqr, Mufti Muhammad Akmal, Mufti Shahid, Mufti Sohail Raza Amjadi, Mufti Muhammad Aamir, Muhammad Ajmal Raza Qadri. Other shows include Qur'an teachings, hadith, talk shows, question-and-answer shows, Qawwali music and Na`at poetry.

Further reading 
 Ary Qtv

See also 
 Madani Channel
 Islam Channel

References

 

Islamic television networks
Television channels and stations established in 2003
Television stations in Pakistan
Religious television stations in Pakistan
Television stations in Karachi